First Canadian Place (originally First Bank Building) is a skyscraper in the Financial District of Toronto, Ontario, at the northwest corner of King and Bay streets, and serves as the global operational headquarters of the Bank of Montreal. At , it is the tallest building in Canada, the 31st tallest building in North America, and the 105th tallest in the world. It is also the third tallest free-standing structure in Canada, after the CN Tower (also in Toronto) and the Inco Superstack chimney (projected to be demolished) in Sudbury, Ontario. The building is owned by Manulife Financial Corporation (50 per cent) in addition to a private consortium of investors including CPP Investments. The building is managed by Brookfield Properties.

History and architecture

First Canadian Place is named for Canada's first bank, the Bank of Montreal. Designed by B+H Architects with Edward Durell Stone as a design consultant, First Canadian Place was constructed in 1975 and originally named First Bank Building. The tower and associated buildings occupy a block once home to two major newspapers, the Toronto Star’s Toronto Star Building and The Globe and Mails William H. Wright Building. The site was the last of the corners at King and Bay to be redeveloped in the 1960s and 1970s, and a major bidding war began over the property. The then-little-known firm of Olympia and York eventually obtained nearly the whole city block, but the election of reformist mayor David Crombie led to new rules banning skyscrapers. It took three years of lobbying before permission for First Canadian Place was granted. When completed, the building was nearly identical in appearance to Stone's Aon Center in Chicago, Illinois; completed two years previous as the Standard Oil Building, the Chicago tower is of the same floor plan and clad in the same marble, the only overtly visible difference being the vertical orientation of the windows, as opposed to the horizontal run of those on First Canadian Place.

First Canadian Place was the 6th tallest building in the world to structural top (currently 103rd) and the tallest building overall outside of Chicago and New York when built-in 1975. It was also the tallest building in the Commonwealth of Nations until the completion of the Petronas Towers in Kuala Lumpur, Malaysia, in 1998. The Bank of Montreal "M-bar" logo at the top of the building was the highest sign in the world from 1975 until overtaken by the sign atop CITIC Plaza in 1997. The roof is still the location of a number of antennas used for radio and television broadcasting. The structure contains 29 elevators, and is one of only a few buildings in the world that uses the double-decked variety, and is connected to the underground PATH system.

The building was pictured on the front and rear cover of the 1981 album This Is the Ice Age by Canadian New Wave band Martha and the Muffins and also their 7" single "Women Around the World at Work". The album featured two photos which were taken from the same place but at different times by Muffins guitarist Mark Gane using a time-lapse camera and features the building at midday and dusk. The 7" cover again features the same photo but has 9 small images taken at various times of the day and night.

Cladding

The same white Carrara marble used on Aon Center was employed as an exterior cladding and interior finish for First Canadian Place, with approximately 45,000 marble panels weighing around  each. Foreshadowing what would take place with First Canadian Place in 2007, one of the marble slabs of Aon Center, when it was named the Standard Oil Building, detached in 1974, falling and penetrating the roof of a neighbouring building, resulting in an eventual recladding of the entire Aon Center in white granite between 1992 and 1994.

In late 2009, owner Brookfield Properties announced it would follow the example of Aon Center and, over three years, replace the tower's 45,000 marble panels with new ones in glass, those on the main expanses with a white ceramic frit and the corners in a bronze tint. Brookfield and the co-owners also launched a multi-faceted rejuvenation program, including "upgrades to the building's mechanical, electrical, and lighting systems that will redefine the standard for enhanced performance, comfort, and greening". FCP's common areas including upper and lower level entrance and elevator lobbies, the retail concourse and Market Place were to also undergo renovation, with new natural stone flooring, fritted glass accents, brushed metal handrails, landscaping, and water features. The rejuvenation program design architects were Moed de Armas & Shannon Architects and Bregman + Hamann Architects were the architects of record. The entire project, completed in 2012, cost was in excess of CA$100 million, paid by the owner. This extensive capital improvement project was intended to provide a new exterior for FCP and eliminate the maintenance costs associated with marble upkeep.

Tenants

Bank of Montreal
Osler, Hoskin & Harcourt
DLA Piper
Bennett Jones
Gowling WLG

Broadcasting
The following Toronto-area broadcasters have their transmitters atop First Canadian Place:

FM stations

CIND-FM 88.1 (Indie 88)
CKLN-FM 88.1 (The first radio station to use this transmitter tower.  Now defunct.)
CIRV-FM 88.9
CIUT-FM 89.5
CJBC-FM 90.3 (Radio-Canada Espace Musique)
CKIS-FM 92.5 (Kiss 92.5)
CFXJ-FM 93.5 (93.5 The Move)
CJKX-FM-2 95.9 (KX96) +
CFMZ-FM 96.3 (Classical 96)
CFZM-1-FM 96.7 (AM740) *
CKFG-FM 98.7 (G 98.7)
CBLA-FM 99.1 (CBC Radio One)
CJSA-FM 101.3 (CMR Diversity FM)
CFNY-FM 102.1 (102.1 The Edge) #
CFPT-FM 106.5 (First Peoples Radio)
CILQ-FM 107.1 (Q107) #

# backup transmitter; main transmitter on CN Tower
+ synchronous transmitter; provides supplementary coverage to primary transmitter in Ajax
* fill-in transmitter; serves downtown core and surrounding inner-city neighbourhoods

Amateur Radio
An amateur Radio digital mobile radio repeater for the Greater Toronto area (VA3XPR) has its antennas mounted just above the broadcast antennas on the radio mast. There are also other analog ham repeaters on the building.

Shopping Mall
According to the First Canadian Place website, the lower floors of the building, as part of the Toronto Path system, feature:

 120 stores in three floors of Carrara marble
 6 restaurants
 over 30 eateries
 medical centre, featuring an optometrist`s office and dental clinics
 spas, beauty salons, and a barbershop
 banking and financial planning services from the Bank of Montreal
 dry cleaning and shoe repair
 post office
 FedEx and UPS dropbox
 a parkette on King Street, between the FCP and the Exchange Tower

See also
 Bank of Montreal Head Office
 List of tallest buildings in Canada
 List of tallest buildings in the British Empire and the Commonwealth
 List of tallest buildings in Toronto
 List of tallest freestanding steel structures
 List of tallest freestanding structures in the world

References

External links

 First Canadian Place tenant website
 First Canadian Place retail and events website
 First Canadian Place mall website

Bank headquarters in Canada
Bank of Montreal
Modernist architecture in Canada
PATH (Toronto)
Shopping malls in Toronto
Skyscrapers in Toronto
Edward Durell Stone buildings
Brookfield Properties buildings
Skyscraper office buildings in Canada
Office buildings completed in 1975